Margaret Mary Feeny  (1917 – 3 January 2012) was the founder and first director of London's Africa Centre charity, from 1964 to 1978.

Biography
Margaret Feeny was born in 1917, the eleventh of twelve children to a successful businessman.

Feeny was General Secretary of the Sword of the Spirit, which became the Catholic Institute for International Relations (CIIR), and then Progressio.

In 1975 she moved to Bath, Somerset. She became an SDP then Liberal Democrat councillor in 1994, and mayor of Bath in 1996, but had a stroke while on official business to their twin town of Aix-en-Provence.

She died in early 2012 aged 94 and her funeral took place at St John's Church, South Parade, Bath, on 18 January.

References

External links
Images of Margaret Feeney: "Margaret Feeney, 2 February 1983"; "Margaret Feeney outside the Guildhall, Bath 1996?", Bath In Time (online images).

1917 births
2012 deaths
Members of the Order of the British Empire
Liberal Democrats (UK) councillors
Women councillors in England
Mayors of Bath, Somerset